Springfield Airport was an airfield operational in the mid-20th century in Springfield, Massachusetts. Its market has been more recently served by the Bradley International Airport in Windsor Locks, Connecticut.

Granville Brothers Aircraft was based at the airfield.  The land is now occupied by a shopping center.

References

Springfield, Massachusetts
Defunct airports in Massachusetts
Airports in Hampden County, Massachusetts